Alfredo C. "Toto" Leonidas (born October 10, 1960 in Bacolod, Philippines) is a Filipino poker player with over $3,200,000 in live tournament lifetime winnings. His 24 WSOP cashes account for $812,218 of those winnings.

In the 2003 World Series of Poker, Leonidas won a World Series of Poker bracelet playing seven-card stud. He also won the United States Poker Championship that same year at a final table that contained the likes of Erik Seidel, Phil Hellmuth and John Hennigan.

In 2009, Leonidas made it to his first final table on the World Poker Tour, at the Bicycle Casino Legends of Poker Event.  He finished in fourth place, earning $144,600 in the tournament won by Prahlad Friedman.  This was his fifth cash in WPT events.

Leonidas currently resides in Glendale, California.

World Series of Poker Bracelet

References

1960 births
Living people
Filipino emigrants to the United States
American poker players
World Series of Poker bracelet winners